This is a list of seasons played by Tromsø IL in Norwegian and European football, from 1921 to the most recent completed season. It details the club's achievements in major competitions, and the top scorers for some season.
{|class="wikitable"
|- style="background:#efefef;"
! Season
! League
! Tier
! Pos.
! Pl.
! W
! D
! L
! GS
! GA
! P
!Cup
!NN-Cup
!colspan=2|Europe
!Notes
!League Top Scorer
|-
|1921
|Local
|
|align=right |2
|align=right|6||align=right|4||align=right|0||align=right|2
|align=right|14||align=right|14||align=right|8
||
||
|
|
|
|
|-
|1922
|Local
|
|align=right |3
|align=right|6||align=right|3||align=right|0||align=right|3
|align=right|8||align=right|15||align=right|6
||
||
|
|
|
|
|-
|1923
|Local
|
|align=right |3
|align=right|6||align=right|1||align=right|1||align=right|4
|align=right|12||align=right|22||align=right|3
||
||
|
|
|
|
|-
|1924
|Local
|
|align=right |3
|align=right|6||align=right|1||align=right|2||align=right|3
|align=right|14||align=right|17||align=right|4
||
||
|
|
|
|
|-
|1925
|Local
|
|align=right |2
|align=right|2||align=right|1||align=right|0||align=right|1
|align=right|7||align=right|5||align=right|2
||
||
|
|
|
|
|-
|1926
|Local
|
|align=right |2
|align=right|2||align=right|1||align=right|0||align=right|1
|align=right|5||align=right|7||align=right|2
||
||
|
|
|
|
|-
|1927
|Local
|
|align=right |1
|align=right|3||align=right|2||align=right|0||align=right|1
|align=right|7||align=right|8||align=right|4
||
||
|
|
|
|
|-
|1928
|Local
|
|align=right |2
|align=right|4||align=right|1||align=right|1||align=right|2
|align=right|11||align=right|9||align=right|3
||
||
|
|
|
|
|-
| style="text-align:center;" colspan="17"|The Northern Norwegian Cup is founded.
|-
|1929
|Local
|
|align=right |2
|align=right|3||align=right|2||align=right|0||align=right|1
|align=right|10||align=right|2||align=right|4
||
| style="background:bronze;"|
|
|
|
|
|-
|1930
|Local
|
|align=right |2
|align=right|3||align=right|2||align=right|0||align=right|1
|align=right|9||align=right|5||align=right|4
||
| style="background:bronze;"|Semi-final
|
|
|
|
|-
|1931
|Local
|
|align=right |2
|align=right|3||align=right|1||align=right|1||align=right|1
|align=right|6||align=right|4||align=right|3
||
|bgcolor=gold|Winners
|
|
|
|
|-
|1932
|Local
|
|align=right |1
|align=right|3||align=right|3||align=right|0||align=right|0
|align=right|8||align=right|1||align=right|6
||
| style="background:bronze;"|Semi-final
|
|
|
|
|-
|1933
|Local
|
|align=right |1
|align=right|6||align=right|4||align=right|1||align=right|1
|align=right|14||align=right|10||align=right|9
||
||First round
|
|
|
|Gustav Dalsbø (6)
|-
|1934
|Local
|
|align=right |6
|align=right|5||align=right|2||align=right|0||align=right|3
|align=right|8||align=right|12||align=right|4
||
|Semi-final
|
|
|
|Isak Shotland, Gustav Dalsbø (2)
|-
|1935
|Local
|
|align=right |3
|align=right|5||align=right|3||align=right|0||align=right|2
|align=right|13||align=right|11||align=right|6
||
||First round
|
|
|
|Gustav Dalsbø, Daniel Olsen (4)
|-
|1936
|Local
|
|align=right |1
|align=right|5||align=right|4||align=right|1||align=right|0
|align=right|16||align=right|6||align=right|9
||
||
|
|
|
|
|-
|1937
|Local
|
|align=right |1
|align=right|5||align=right|3||align=right|1||align=right|1
|align=right|17||align=right|8||align=right|7
||
| style="background:silver;"|Runners-up
|
|
|
|
|-
|1938
|Local
|
|align=right |3
|align=right|5||align=right|3||align=right|0||align=right|2
|align=right|11||align=right|17||align=right|6
||
||First round
|
|
|
|
|-
|1939
|Local
|
|align=right |6
|align=right|5||align=right|0||align=right|0||align=right|5
|align=right|5||align=right|23||align=right|0
||
| style="background:bronze;"|Semi-final
|
|
|
|Helge Bendiksen (2)
|-
| style="text-align:center;" colspan="17"|No football between 1940 and 1945 due to World War II
|-
|1945
|Local
|
|align=right |2
|align=right|5||align=right|2||align=right|2||align=right|1
|align=right|9||align=right|6||align=right|
||
||
|
|
|League played as cup
|Nordvald Johansen, Jens Jensen,Helge Bendiksen, Hans Mortensen (2)
|-
|1946
|Local
|
|align=right |1
|align=right|8||align=right|7||align=right|0||align=right|1
|align=right|29||align=right|11||align=right|14
||
| style="background:bronze;"|Semi-final
|
|
|
|Ingvald Jeremiassen, Gudmund Gundersen (9)
|-
|1947
|Local
|
|align=right |5
|align=right|7||align=right|2||align=right|3||align=right|2
|align=right|15||align=right|10||align=right|7
||
||Third round
|
|
|
|Ingvald Jeremiassen (5)
|-
|1948
|Local
|
|align=right |2
|align=right|5||align=right|3||align=right|1||align=right|1
|align=right|11||align=right|9||align=right|7
||
||First round
|
|
|
|Hans Mortensen (5)
|-
|1949
|Local
|
|align=right |2
|align=right|5||align=right|3||align=right|1||align=right|1
|align=right|14||align=right|7||align=right|7
||
|bgcolor=gold|Winners
|
|
|
|Helge Bendiksen, Gudmund Gundersen (4)
|-
|1950
|Local
|
|align=right |1
|align=right|5||align=right|5||align=right|0||align=right|0
|align=right|23||align=right|4||align=right|10
||
||Second round
|
|
|
|Hans Mortensen (7)
|-
|1951
|Local
|
|align=right |1
|align=right|10||align=right|10||align=right|0||align=right|0
|align=right|40||align=right|7||align=right|20
||
||Second round
|
|
|
|Oskar Theodorsen, Sigmund Hemmingsen (9)
|-
|1952
|Local
|
|align=right |1
|align=right|5||align=right|5||align=right|0||align=right|0
|align=right|31||align=right|4||align=right|10
||
| style="background:silver;"|Runners-up
|
|
|
|Sigmund Hemmingsen (13)
|-
|1953
|Local
|
|align=right |1
|align=right|5||align=right|5||align=right|0||align=right|0
|align=right|23||align=right|2||align=right|10
||
||Third round
|
|
|
|Sigmund Hemmingsen (8)
|-
|1954
|Local
|
|align=right |1
|align=right|5||align=right|4||align=right|0||align=right|1
|align=right|18||align=right|11||align=right|8
||
||Third round
|
|
|
|Leif Johnsen (8)
|-
| style="text-align:center;" colspan="17"|Districts 9 and 10 included in the 1st division
|-
|1955
|1D10
|III
|align=right|3
|align=right|8||align=right|3||align=right|3||align=right|2
|align=right|16||align=right|11||align=right|9
||
||Quarter-final
|
|
|
|Arnold Jensen (5)
|-
|1956
|1D10
|III
|align=right |4
|align=right|9||align=right|3||align=right|3||align=right|3
|align=right|13||align=right|10||align=right|9
||
|bgcolor=gold|Winners
|
|
|
|Egil Johansen (6)
|-
|1957
|1D10
|III
|align=right|3
|align=right|10||align=right|5||align=right|0||align=right|5
|align=right|18||align=right|16||align=right|10
||
||Quarter-final
|
|
|
|Tor Brandeggen (9)
|-
| style="text-align:center;" colspan="17"|The 1st division changes its name to the 3rd division.
|-
|1958
|3D10
|III
|align=right|3
|align=right|10||align=right|4||align=right|2||align=right|4
|align=right|19||align=right|14||align=right|10
||
||Quarter-final
|
|
|
|Tor Brandeggen (5)
|-
|1959
|3D10
|III
|align=right|2
|align=right|10||align=right|8||align=right|0||align=right|2
|align=right|34||align=right|13||align=right|16
||
||Quarter-final
|
|
|
|Edmund Kristoffersen (13)
|-
|1960
|3D10
|III
|align=right |4
|align=right|10||align=right|5||align=right|2||align=right|3
|align=right|32||align=right|18||align=right|12
||
|Semi-final
|
|
|
|Tor Brandeggen (8)
|-
|1961
|3D10
|III
|align=right |5
|align=right|10||align=right|3||align=right|1||align=right|6
|align=right|16||align=right|19||align=right|7
||
||Third round
|
|
|
|Tor Brandeggen, Jan Willy Klungseth (5)
|-
|1962
|3D10
|III
|align=right |4
|align=right|10||align=right|4||align=right|1||align=right|5
|align=right|18||align=right|19||align=right|9
||
||Quarter-final
|
|
|
|Egil Bygdnes (6)
|-
| style="text-align:center;" colspan="17"|Northern Norwegian clubs allowed into the cup for the first time.
|-
|1963
|3D10
|III
|align=right|2
|align=right|10||align=right|6||align=right|1||align=right|3
|align=right|14||align=right|12||align=right|13
||
| style="background:bronze;"|Semi-final
|
|
|
|Tor Brandeggen (4)
|-
|1964
|3D10
|III
|align=right|3
|align=right|10||align=right|6||align=right|2||align=right|2
|align=right|19||align=right|15||align=right|14
||Second round
| style="background:bronze;"|Semi-final
|
|
|
|Jon Risa (4)
|-
|1965
|3D10
|III
|align=right |4
|align=right|10||align=right|4||align=right|1||align=right|5
|align=right|15||align=right|17||align=right|9
||Second round
||Third round
|
|
|
|Jan Willy Klungseth (5)
|-
|1966
|3D10
|III
|align=right bgcolor="#FFCCCC"| 5
|align=right|10||align=right|2||align=right|2||align=right|6
|align=right|12||align=right|25||align=right|6
||
||Quarter-final
|
|
|Relegated
|Per Steinar Hansen, Egil Bygdnes,John Nilsen, Jon Risa (2)
|-
|1967
|4DT
|IV
|align=right|2
|align=right|14||align=right|7||align=right|6||align=right|1
|align=right|31||align=right|11||align=right|20
||
||Third round
|
|
|
|Jon Risa (10)
|-
|1968
|4DT
|IV
|align=right|2
|align=right|14||align=right|9||align=right|0||align=right|5
|align=right|31||align=right|17||align=right|18
||
| style="background:bronze;"|Semi-final
|
|
|
|Svein Hugo Hansen (10)
|-
|1969
|4DT
|IV
|align=right|4
|align=right|14||align=right|6||align=right|3||align=right|5
|align=right|20||align=right|17||align=right|15
||First round
||Second round
|
|
|
|Svein Hugo Hansen (5)
|-
| style="text-align:center;" colspan="17"|Northern Norwegian 4th division given status as 3rd division. Northern Norwegian Cup discontinued.
|-
|1970
|3DT
|III
|align=right bgcolor=#DDFFDD| 1
|align=right|14||align=right|10||align=right|0||align=right|4
|align=right|30||align=right|13||align=right|20
||First round
||
|
|
|Won play-off, promoted
|Steinar Pedersen (10)
|-
|1971
|2DC
|II
|align=right|3
|align=right|14||align=right|7||align=right|5||align=right|2
|align=right|29||align=right|21||align=right|19
||Second qual. round
||
|
|
|
|Sigurd Dale, Jens Petter Jensen (8)
|-
| style="text-align:center;" colspan="17"|Northern Norwegian clubs are allowed to be promoted to the top flight for the first time.
|-
|1972
|2DC
|II
|align=right bgcolor="#FFCCCC"| 7
|align=right|14||align=right|3||align=right|3||align=right|8
|align=right|12||align=right|23||align=right|9
||Third round
||
|
|
|Relegated
|Jens Petter Jensen (4)
|-
|1973
|3DT
|III
|align=right|2
|align=right|14||align=right|10||align=right|2||align=right|2
|align=right|33||align=right|9||align=right|22
||Second qual. round
||
|
|
|
|Arne Andreassen, Torfinn Ingebrigtsen (10)
|-
|1974
|3DT
|III
|align=right bgcolor=#DDFFDD|1
|align=right|14||align=right|8||align=right|4||align=right|2
|align=right|31||align=right|12||align=right|20
||Third round
||
|
|
|Won play-off, promoted
|Jack Andersen (9)
|-
|1975
|2DC
|II
|align=right bgcolor="#FFCCCC"| 6
|align=right|14||align=right|4||align=right|4||align=right|6
|align=right|23||align=right|16||align=right|12
||Third round
||
|
|
|Relegated
|Arne Andreassen (4)
|-
|1976
|3DT
|III
|align=right|2
|align=right|18||align=right|11||align=right|5||align=right|2
|align=right|57||align=right|13||align=right|27
||1st qual round
||
|
|
|
|Hans Tore Bjerkås (11)
|-
|1977
|3DT
|III
|align=right bgcolor=#DDFFDD|1
|align=right|18||align=right|13||align=right|4||align=right|1
|align=right|49||align=right|18||align=right|30
||Second round
||
|
|
|Won play-off, promoted
|Hans Tore Bjerkås (15)
|-
|1978
|2DC
|II
|align=right|1
|align=right|18||align=right|12||align=right|3||align=right|3
|align=right|43||align=right|15||align=right|27
||Fourth round
||
|
|
|Lost play-off
|Terje Nikolaysen (11)
|-
| style="text-align:center;" colspan="17"|The 2nd division changes from having three groups (A, B, and C) to two (A and B).
|-
|1979
|2DB
|II
|align=right bgcolor="#FFCCCC"| 11
|align=right|22||align=right|5||align=right|4||align=right|13
|align=right|24||align=right|52||align=right|14
||Third round
||
|
|
|Relegated
|Terje Nikolaysen (10)
|-
|1980
|3DF
|III
|align=right bgcolor=#DDFFDD| 1
|align=right|18||align=right|14||align=right|4||align=right|0
|align=right|43||align=right|9||align=right|32
||Second round
||
|
|
|Promoted
|Trond Gunnar Nilsen (15)
|-
|1981
|2DB
|II
|align=right bgcolor="#FFCCCC"| 10
|align=right|22||align=right|4||align=right|9||align=right|9
|align=right|12||align=right|28||align=right|17
||First round
||
|
|
|Relegated
|Einar Walsøe (3)
|-
|1982
|3DF
|III
|align=right bgcolor=#DDFFDD| 1
|align=right|18||align=right|15||align=right|2||align=right|1
|align=right|50||align=right|13||align=right|32
||Third round
||
|
|
|Promoted
|Trond Gunnar Nilsen (12)
|-
|1983
|2DB
|II
|align=right|6
|align=right|22||align=right|5||align=right|11||align=right|6
|align=right|19||align=right|24||align=right|21
||First round
||
|
|
|
|Lars Espejord (5)
|-
|1984
|2DB
|II
|align=right|4
|align=right|22||align=right|11||align=right|4||align=right|7
|align=right|46||align=right|33||align=right|26
||First round
||
|
|
|
|Trond Johansen (15)
|-
|1985
|2DB
|II
|align=right bgcolor=#DDFFDD| 2
|align=right|22||align=right|15||align=right|3||align=right|4
|align=right|45||align=right|20||align=right|33
|
||
|
|
|Won play-off, promoted
|Sigmund Forfang (7)
|-
|1986
|1D
|I
|align=right|10
|align=right|22||align=right|6||align=right|6||align=right|10
|align=right|23||align=right|32||align=right|18
|bgcolor=gold|Winners
||
|
|
|Won play-off
|Trond Johansen (6)
|-
|1987
|1D
|I
|align=right|6
|align=right|22||align=right|5||align=right|7/2||align=right|8
|align=right|19||align=right|31||align=right|31
||Quarter-final
||
|CWC
|First round
|
|Per-Mathias Høgmo (6)
|-
|1988
|1D
|I
|align=right|5
|align=right|22||align=right|9||align=right|6||align=right|7
|align=right|27||align=right|22||align=right|33
||Fourth round
||
|
|
|
|Lars Espejord (6)
|-
|1989
|1D
|I
|style="text-align:right; background:#c96;"|3
|align=right|22||align=right|11||align=right|4||align=right|7
|align=right|36||align=right|25||align=right|37
||Fourth round
||
|
|
|
|Mike McCabe (10)
|-
|1990
|1D
|I
|style="text-align:right; background:silver;"|2
|align=right|22||align=right|12||align=right|6||align=right|4
|align=right|36||align=right|21||align=right|42
||Quarter-final
||
|
|
|
|Mike McCabe (13)
|-
| style="text-align:center;" colspan="17"|The 1st division changes its name to Tippeligaen.
|-
|1991
|TL
|I
|align=right|6
|align=right|22||align=right|9||align=right|4||align=right|9
|align=right|28||align=right|34||align=right|31
||Quarter-final
||
|UC
|First round
|
|Stein Berg Johansen (10)
|-
|1992
|TL
|I
|align=right|8
|align=right|22||align=right|6||align=right|6||align=right|10
|align=right|22||align=right|37||align=right|24
||Quarter-final
||
|
|
|
|Sigurd Rushfeldt, Bjørn Johansen (4)
|-
|1993
|TL
|I
|align=right|6
|align=right|22||align=right|6||align=right|8||align=right|8
|align=right|25||align=right|25||align=right|26
||Quarter-final
||
|
|
|
|Sigurd Rushfeldt (9)
|-
|1994
|TL
|I
|align=right|7
|align=right|22||align=right|7||align=right|7||align=right|8
|align=right|22||align=right|28||align=right|28
||Quarter-final
||
|
|
|
|Sigurd Rushfeldt (13)
|-
|1995
|TL
|I
|align=right|6
|align=right|26||align=right|11||align=right|5||align=right|10
|align=right|53||align=right|42||align=right|38
||Quarter-final
||
|IC
|Group stage
|
|Tore André Flo (18)
|-
|1996
|TL
|I
|align=right|5
|align=right|26||align=right|11||align=right|8||align=right|7
|align=right|46||align=right|41||align=right|41
|bgcolor=gold|Winners
||
|
|
|
|Sigurd Rushfeldt (15)
|-
|1997
|TL
|I
|align=right|12
|align=right|26||align=right|6||align=right|10||align=right|10
|align=right|37||align=right|44||align=right|28
||Fourth round
||
|CWC
|Second round
|Won play-off
|Ole Martin Årst (9)
|-
|1998
|TL
|I
|align=right|11
|align=right|26||align=right|7||align=right|7||align=right|12
|align=right|39||align=right|48||align=right|28
||Fourth round
||
|
|
|
|Rune Lange (20)
|-
|1999
|TL
|I
|align=right|6
|align=right|26||align=right|13||align=right|5||align=right|8
|align=right|70||align=right|46||align=right|44
|Semi-final
||
|
|
|
|Rune Lange (23)*
|-
|2000
|TL
|I
|align=right|4
|align=right|26||align=right|13||align=right|5||align=right|8
|align=right|51||align=right|46||align=right|44
||Fourth round
||
|
|
|
|Tryggvi Guðmundsson (15)
|-
|2001
|TL
|I
|align=right bgcolor="#FFCCCC"|14
|align=right|26||align=right|4||align=right|4||align=right|18
|align=right|23||align=right|52||align=right|16
||Quarter-final
||
|
|
|Relegated
|Abdoulaye M'Baye (6)
|-
|2002
|1D
|II
|align=right bgcolor=#DDFFDD| 1
|align=right|30||align=right|21||align=right|4||align=right|5
|align=right|78||align=right|36||align=right|67
||Quarter-final
||
|
|
|Promoted
|Morten Gamst Pedersen (18)*
|-
|2003
|TL
|I
|align=right|11
|align=right|26||align=right|8||align=right|5||align=right|13
|align=right|30||align=right|52||align=right|29
|Semi-final
||
|
|
|
|Peter Kovacs (8)
|-
|2004
|TL
|I
|align=right|4
|align=right|26||align=right|12||align=right|4||align=right|10
|align=right|38||align=right|32||align=right|40
||Fourth round
||
|RL
|Group stage
|
|Ole Martin Årst (11)
|-
|2005
|TL
|I
|align=right|8
|align=right|26||align=right|8||align=right|10||align=right|8
|align=right|31||align=right|30||align=right|34
||Third round
||
|UC
|Group stage
|
|Ole Martin Årst (16)*
|-
|2006
|TL
|I
|align=right|10
|align=right|26||align=right|8||align=right|5||align=right|13
|align=right|33||align=right|39||align=right|29
||Third round
||
|
|
|
|Ole Martin Årst (11)
|-
|2007
|TL
|I
|align=right|6
|align=right|26||align=right|12||align=right|4||align=right|10
|align=right|45||align=right|44||align=right|40
||Fourth round
||
|
|
|
|Morten Moldskred (12)
|-
|2008
|TL
|I
|style="text-align:right; background:#c96;"|3
|align=right|26||align=right|12||align=right|8||align=right|6
|align=right|36||align=right|23||align=right|44
||Fourth round
||
|
|
|
|Morten Moldskred (10)
|-
|2009
|TL
|I
|align=right |6
|align=right|30||align=right|10||align=right|10||align=right|10
|align=right|35||align=right|36||align=right|40
||Quarter-final
||
|EL
|Play-off round
|
|Sigurd Rushfeldt (9)
|-
|2010
|TL
|I
|style="text-align:right; background:#c96;"|3
|align=right|30||align=right|14||align=right|8||align=right|8
|align=right|36||align=right|30||align=right|50
||Fourth round
||
|
|
|
|Sigurd Rushfeldt, George Mourad (8)
|-
|2011
|TL
|I
|align=right bgcolor=silver|2
|align=right|30||align=right|15||align=right|8||align=right|7
|align=right|56||align=right|34||align=right|53
||Fourth round
||
|EL
|Second qualifying round
|
|Mostafa Abdellaoue (17)*
|-
|2012
|TL
|I
|align=right |4
|align=right|30||align=right|14||align=right|7||align=right|9
|align=right|45||align=right|32||align=right|49
|bgcolor=silver|Runners-up
||
|EL
|Play-off round
|
|Zdeněk Ondrášek (14)*
|-
|2013
|TL
|I
|align=right bgcolor="#FFCCCC"| 15
|align=right|30||align=right|7||align=right|8||align=right|15
|align=right|41||align=right|50||align=right|29
||Fourth round
||
|EL
|Group stage
|Relegated
|Zdeněk Ondrášek (8)
|-
|2014
|1D
|II
|align=center bgcolor=#DDFFDD| 2
|align=right|30||align=right|18||align=right|5||align=right|7
|align=right|67||align=right|27||align=right|59
||Third round
||
|EL
|Second qualifying round
|Promoted
|Zdeněk Ondrášek (15)
|-
|2015
|TL
|I
|align=right|13
|align=right|30||align=right|7||align=right|8||align=right|15
|align=right|36||align=right|50||align=right|29
||Second round
||
|
|
|
|Zdeněk Ondrášek (9)
|-
|2016
|TL
|I
|align=right|13
|align=right|30||align=right|9||align=right|7||align=right|14
|align=right|36||align=right|46||align=right|34
||Quarter-final
||
|
|
|
|Thomas Lehne Olsen (8)
|-
|2017
|ES
|I
|align=right |11
|align=right|30||align=right|10||align=right|8||align=right|12
|align=right|42||align=right|49||align=right|38
||Fourth round
||
|
|
|
|Thomas Lehne Olsen (10)
|-
|2018
|ES
|I
|align=right |10
|align=right|30||align=right|11||align=right|3||align=right|16
|align=right|41||align=right|48||align=right|36
||Fourth round
||
|
|
|
|Runar Espejord (6)
|-
|2019
|ES
|I
|align=right bgcolor="#FFCCCC"| 15
|align=right|30||align=right|8||align=right|6||align=right|16
|align=right|39||align=right|58||align=right|30
||Third round
||
|
|
|Relegated
|Onni Valakari (7)
|-
|}

*Also top scorer for the entire league.

References

Seasons
 
Tromso